The 2010 Sacrifice was a professional wrestling pay-per-view event produced by Total Nonstop Action Wrestling (TNA), which took place on May 16, 2010 at the TNA Impact! Zone in Orlando, Florida. It is the sixth event under the Sacrifice chronology and the fifth event of the 2010 TNA PPV schedule.

In October 2017, with the launch of the Global Wrestling Network, the event became available to stream on demand. It would later be available on Impact Plus in May 2019.

Storylines

Sacrifice featured nine professional wrestling matches that involved different wrestlers from pre-existing scripted feuds and storylines. Wrestlers portrayed villains, heroes, or less distinguishable characters in the scripted events that built tension and culminated in a wrestling match or series of matches.

Results

References

External links
Tnasacrifice.com
TNA Wrestling.com

Impact Wrestling Sacrifice
2010 in professional wrestling in Florida
2010 in professional wrestling
Events in Orlando, Florida
Professional wrestling in Orlando, Florida
May 2010 events in the United States
2010 Total Nonstop Action Wrestling pay-per-view events